James Matheson (1796–1878) was a Scottish trader in India.

James Matheson may also refer to:

 James Matheson (skier) (born 1995), Australian freestyle skier 
 James Matheson (composer) (born 1970), American composer
 James Gunn Matheson (1912–2007), Scottish minister
 Jim Matheson (born 1960), American politician
 Jim Matheson (journalist) (born 1949), Canadian sports journalist

See also
 James Mathison (born 1978), Australian television presenter